Joseph Valsin Guillotte (29 June 1850 – 24 June 1917), served as the 42nd mayor of New Orleans, from April 29, 1884 to April 23, 1888. Buried in St. Vincent de Paul Cemetery, New Orleans, LA. Married to Ezilda Bernard (died January 14, 1917 in New Orleans, LA).

Mayors of New Orleans
1917 deaths
1850 births